Liberty Grove is an unincorporated community in Dallas County, Texas, United States. Liberty Grove was a small farming community at the junction of Farm Road 1880 and a dirt thoroughfare, on Doctors Creek and the South Sulphur River, south of Cooper in south central Delta County.

Notes

Unincorporated communities in Dallas County, Texas
Unincorporated communities in Texas